Inger Andersen can refer to

Inger Marie Andersen (1930–1995), Norwegian actress
Inger Andersen (environmentalist) (born 1958), Danish environmentalist